Pakistan Tobacco Board (PTB) is a statutory semi-autonomous department of Government of Pakistan under Ministry of Commerce. Pakistan Tobacco Board oversees the promotion of the cultivation, manufacture and export of tobacco and tobacco products in Pakistan.

External links
 Pakistan Tobacco Board

References 

Tobacco in Pakistan
Pakistan federal departments and agencies
Ministry of Commerce (Pakistan)